Renato Olmi (12 July 1914 – 15 May 1985) was an Italian footballer who played as a midfielder.

Club career
During his club career, Olmi played for Italian sides Ambrosiana-Inter and Juventus in Serie A. He also played for Crema, Cremonese, and Brescia in the lower divisions.

International career
Olmi was part of the 1938 FIFA World Cup-winning squad that won Italy's second World Cup title. He earned 3 caps for the Italy national team in 1940.

Honours

Club
Cremonese
Serie C: 1935–36
Inter
Serie A: 1937–38, 1939–40
Coppa Italia: 1938–39
Juventus
Coppa Italia: 1941–42

International
Italy
FIFA World Cup: 1938

References

External links
Profile at Enciclopediadelcalcio.it

1914 births
1985 deaths
Italian footballers
Italy international footballers
1938 FIFA World Cup players
FIFA World Cup-winning players
Inter Milan players
Juventus F.C. players
U.S. Cremonese players
Serie A players

Association football midfielders